Andreas Kuffner is the name of:
 Andreas Kuffner (Luftwaffe), recipient of Knight's Cross of the Iron Cross
 Andreas Kuffner (rower) (born 1987), German rower